The 2022 Summit League women's soccer season started non-conference play on August 10, 2022, and began conference play on September 23, 2022. The regular season ended on October 23, 2022. The Summit League tournament began on October 28, 2022 and ended on November 5, 2022 with Omaha winning the championship game in penalties. The Mavericks then went on to the NCAA tournament and lost to Notre Dame.

Conference Changes
Following last year's tournament, the conference announced that the 2022 tournament would expand to six teams.

Head Coaches

Coaching Changes

Oral Roberts
On November 4, 2021, Oral Roberts head coach Roger Bush resigned and was replaced on December 10, 2021 by coach Austin Risenhoover.

Western Illinois
On February 15, 2022, Western Illinois announced Josee Primeau was promoted to head coach from her previous role within Dr. Eric Johnson's staff, the previous coach.

Coaches

Notes:

 Year at school includes 2022 season.
 Overall and Summit League records are from the time at their current school and through the end of the 2021 season.
 NCAA tournament appearances are from the time at current school only.

^154 wins, 62 losses, and 28 ties at the Division III level

^^6 NCAA tournament appearances at the Division III level

Preseason Awards
The Preseason Summit League women's soccer polls were released on August 16, 2022.

Preseason women's soccer polls
First Place Votes in Parenthesis

 Denver (6) - 78
 South Dakota State (4) - 76
 Omaha - 63
 South Dakota - 57
 Western Illinois - 45
 Kansas City - 37
 Oral Roberts - 37
 St. Thomas - 26
 North Dakota State - 17
 North Dakota - 14

Regular season

Conference standings

Source:

Conference Matrix

Players of the Week

Record against other conferences

All-League Honors

Source:

Conference Tournament
Source:

References

Summit League Women's Soccer Tournament